Glenn Dickson (born 5 November 1954) is  a former Australian rules footballer who played with Richmond in the Victorian Football League (VFL). He is the father of Tory Dickson.

Notes

External links 
		

Living people
1954 births
Australian rules footballers from Victoria (Australia)
Richmond Football Club players
Prahran Football Club players